John P. Carlin is an American attorney and former government official who served as the acting deputy attorney general in the United States Department of Justice from January to April of 2021. From April 2021 to September 2022, Carlin was principal associate deputy attorney general under Deputy Attorney General Lisa Monaco.  He previously served as United States assistant attorney general for the National Security Division from April 2014 to October 15, 2016, and as chief of staff to Robert Mueller during his time as director of the Federal Bureau of Investigation.

Education 
Carlin earned a Bachelor of Arts degree from Williams College and a Juris Doctor from Harvard Law School. While at Harvard, Carlin was the articles editor of the Harvard Journal on Legislation.

Career 
Carlin joined the United States Department of Justice through the Attorney General’s Honors Program. Carlin chairs the Aspen Institute’s Cybersecurity and Technology policy program, and was a Fellow at the Belfer Center for Science and International Affairs. Carlin was a partner at Morrison & Foerster until January 21, 2021, when he was appointed by President Joe Biden to serve as acting deputy attorney general. Following his departure from the DOJ, Carlin returned to private practice at Paul, Weiss in October 2022 as co-head of its cybersecurity and data protection practice.

Carlin has been featured in The New York Times, Vanity Fair, The Washington Post, The Wall Street Journal, the Los Angeles Times, and USA Today. He has appeared on 60 Minutes, Meet the Press, Charlie Rose, NPR, and CNN.

See also
Foreign interference in the 2020 United States elections

Works

References

External links 

Living people
Year of birth missing (living people)
Date of birth missing (living people)
21st-century American lawyers
Biden administration personnel
Federal Bureau of Investigation agents
Harvard Law School alumni
People associated with Morrison & Foerster
United States Assistant Attorneys General
Williams College alumni
Paul, Weiss, Rifkind, Wharton & Garrison people